Ground zero describes the point on the Earth's surface closest to a nuclear detonation.  In the case of an explosion above the ground, ground zero refers to the point on the ground directly below the nuclear detonation. 

Ground zero may also refer to:

 Hypocenter, the site directly below, directly above, or at the point of detonation of a nuclear explosion
 The World Trade Center site in New York City, after the September 11 attacks
 The hypocenters of the atomic bombings of Hiroshima and Nagasaki
 The central plaza of The Pentagon during the Cold War

Books
 Ground Zero (book), by Andrew Holleran
 Ground Zero, X-Files novel by Kevin J. Anderson
 Ground Zero (Deathlands novel)
 Ground Zero (Repairman Jack novel)

Campaigns
 Ground Zero (campaign) in the United States, concerning nuclear weapons
 Climate Ground Zero campaign,  in the United States, against mountaintop-removal mining

Video games
 Ground Zero: Texas, for the Sega CD
 Metal Gear Solid V: Ground Zeroes

Films
 Ground Zero (1973 film)
 Ground Zero (1987 film)
 At Ground Zero, 1993 film
 Bloodfist VI: Ground Zero, 1995 film
 Ground Zero (2000 film)
 Resident Evil: Ground Zero, the working title of 2002 film Resident Evil

Music
 Ground Zero (band), led by Otomo Yoshihide
 Ground Zero (blues club), owned by actor Morgan Freeman

Albums
Ground Zero, album by Vindictiv with Göran Edman and Oliver Hartmann 2009
 Ground Zero (13AD album)
 Ground Zero (As Blood Runs Black album)

Songs
 "Ground Zero", a song by Kerry Livgren from the 1980 album Seeds of Change
 "Ground Zero" (song), by Chris Cornell
 "Ground Zero", a song by Lil Wayne from the album Rebirth

Radio and television
 Ground Zero (TV program), a 1997–2001 Australian music television program that aired on Network Ten
 Ground Zero: In Your House, a 1997 World Wrestling Federation pay-per-view event
 Hotel Ground Zero, a 2009 television documentary, United States

Art
 Ground Zero Gallery

ru:Ground Zero